Scott County Courthouse is a historic courthouse located at Benton, Scott County, Missouri. It was designed by architect Henry H. Hohenschild and built in 1912.  It is a reinforced concrete Beaux Arts style building sheathed in brick. It has a "T"-plan consisting of a three-story, five bay, central block with two-story wings.  Three bays of the central block are recessed behind colossal Ionic order columns that support a dentiled entablature. It features terra cotta and cast stone ornamentation.

It was added to the National Register of Historic Places in 2004.

References

County courthouses in Missouri
Courthouses on the National Register of Historic Places in Missouri
Beaux-Arts architecture in Missouri
Government buildings completed in 1912
Buildings and structures in Scott County, Missouri
National Register of Historic Places in Scott County, Missouri